Un ciclone in famiglia (literally translated A cyclone in the family or Family storm) is an Italian television series broadcast on Canale 5 in 2005, and ended in 2008 by Publispei and Mediaset. in England and America the series is unpublished.

Cast
Massimo Boldi: Lorenzo Fumagalli/Alberto 'Bebo' Marangoni
Barbara De Rossi: Matilde 'Tilly' Beretta in Fumagalli
Maurizio Mattioli: Alberto Dominici
Monica Scattini: Simonetta Ricasoli della Ghirlandaia in Dominici
Carlo Buccirosso: Giuseppe 'Peppino' Esposito
Enio Drovandi: il fattore
Margherita Antonelli: Margherita Esposito (st. 2)
Ussi: Margherita Esposito (st. 3-4)
Benedetta Massola: Lisa Fumagalli
Sarah Calogero: Ludovica 'Ludo' Fumagalli
Virginie Marsan: India Fumagalli
Carlotta Mazzoleni: Laura 'Lauretta' Fumagalli
Michele Bella: Adriano Dominici
Edoardo Natoli: Alessio Dominici
Paolo Stella: Antonio Esposito
Mirko Batoni: Francesco
Mita Medici: Barbara 'Bambi'
Aom Flury: Hubertus von Taxis

Song
The theme song of the fiction is entitled Chiedi aiuto ai papi (literally translated Ask for help from the dads). During the opening, the images of the protagonists and the numerous professionals who contributed to the realization of the television series scroll.

See also
List of Italian television series

References

External links

Italian television series
Canale 5 original programming